Velten is a town in Brandenberg, Germany. People with the surname Velten include,

Geoffroy Velten, (1831–1915), French brewer, newspaper proprietor and senator
Julie Favre (née Velten), (1833–1896), French philosopher and educator
Harry V. Velten (1897-1967), American linguist and professor at Indiana University
Tim Velten (born 1983), American soccer player
Yury Velten or Georg Friedrich Veldten (1730–1801), court architect to Catherine the Great, Empress of Russia